Sir Kenneth Robin Warren  (15 August 1926 – 29 June 2019) was a British Conservative Party politician.

He was educated at Aldenham School, Midsomer Norton Grammar School, King's College London and the London School of Economics. He served as Conservative Member of Parliament for Hastings from 1970 to 1983, and as Conservative Member of Parliament for Hastings and Rye from 1983 until he retired in 1992.

He lived in Cranbrook, Kent. His wife of 51 years, Anne, died in 2013.  He died on 29 June 2019 at the age of 92.

References

External links 
 

1926 births
2019 deaths
People educated at Aldenham School
Alumni of King's College London
Alumni of the London School of Economics
Conservative Party (UK) MPs for English constituencies
Fellows of the Royal Aeronautical Society
Knights Bachelor
Politicians awarded knighthoods
UK MPs 1970–1974
UK MPs 1974
UK MPs 1974–1979
UK MPs 1979–1983
UK MPs 1983–1987
UK MPs 1987–1992
Politics of Hastings